Coton in the Elms is a village and parish in the English county of Derbyshire. At  from the coast, it is the one of the furthest places in the United Kingdom from coastal waters. The population of the civil parish as of the 2011 census was 896.

Church Flatts Farm, defined by the Ordnance Survey as the farthest point from the sea in Great Britain, is less than a mile southeast of the village.

History

Coton is mentioned over a thousand years ago when land was transferred to Wulfrige the Black in AD 942. It is also on the salt route known as Walton Way, which starts in nearby Walton-on-Trent.

Coton in the Elms is mentioned in the Domesday book where it is then spelt Cotes. The book says under the title of “The lands of the Abbey of Burton":

"In Coton in the Elms Ælfgar had two carucates of land to the geld. There is land for three ploughs. Now the abbot has it of the king. There are now one plough in demesne and six villans and three bordars having two ploughs. TRE worth 40 shillings now 30 shillings."

Coton is situated on the Walton Way and is first mentioned in 942 in a charter giving land in the area to Wulfrige the Black. This formed part of a much larger estate covering many of the villages in the area. Coton would seem to have been roughly in the centre of this estate. It would appear that it was a crossroads as there is an old lane which runs all the way from Tamworth through Coton and on northwards towards Burton on Trent. At the time of Domesday Burton Abbey held land at Coton - however this had been initially seized by King William - no doubt in part due to the rebellion led by Earl Morcar. However, by the time of Domesday this land had been restored to Burton. The village itself forms a diamond of roads around a small village green. The original route of the Walton Way may have been the south west corner of this diamond as this runs past the Church and Church Farm. To the north east of the village coal mining became important and this is reflected in the lane name Coalpit Lane.

The present church of St Mary was built in 1844-7 by Henry Isaac Stevens but not on the site of the original church, which was behind the Shoulder of Mutton pub. It has a narrow west tower with a recessed spire. It is generally believed that when the original church fell into disrepair, the bells were taken to the neighbouring Lullington village, so the inhabitants of Coton can still hear the old bells when the wind is in the right direction.

There is a Methodist chapel, built in 1922 to replace a smaller building in Chapel Street. The old building became known as the band room, where for many years a good band was run by a Mr Coates, who was also the village post master. It has also been used as a village hall.

The main occupations of the village inhabitants in the past has been mining and farming, though the pits are now all closed. For many of today's population (896 in 2011) it is a commuter base for the larger towns such as Burton-on-Trent, Swadlincote and Tamworth.

Coton in the Elms has two pubs. The Black Horse was refurbished in 2009. The Queen's Head Inn dates back to the 17th century; part of the premises was once a shop. Another pub, the Shoulder of Mutton, closed in 2010 and is currently being converted to a house.

Distance from sea

Distance from coast
Southeast of the village – at  – is Church Flatts Farm, which is calculated by the Ordnance Survey to be the farthest point from the sea (at the mean low water line) in Great Britain.

Distance from highest tidal water

Highest recorded temperature
The previous Derbyshire record was also at Coton in the Elms:  in July 2019.

Notable residents
 Nigel Sims, a goalkeeper in the 1950s and 1960s for Wolverhampton Wanderers, Aston Villa and England B.

See also
 Listed buildings in Coton in the Elms
 Centre points of the United Kingdom
 Coastline of the United Kingdom

Notes

References

External links

Illustrated details
GENUKI page

Villages in Derbyshire
Civil parishes in Derbyshire
South Derbyshire District